Frovina is a genus of predatory sea snails, marine gastropod mollusks in the family Zerotulidae, the moon snails.

Species
 Frovina angularis Warén & Hain, 1996
 Frovina indecora (Thiele, 1912)
 Frovina soror Thiele, 1912

References

 Warén A. & Hain S. (1996) Description of Zerotulidae fam. nov. (Littorinoidea), with comments on an Antarctic littorinid gastropod. The Veliger 39(4):277-334

Zerotulidae